The Endurance Gold Cup Stakes was an American Thoroughbred horse race run annually during the latter part of November at Bowie Race Track in Bowie, Maryland. Open to two-year-old horses, it was contested on dirt over a distance of a mile and a sixteenth (8.5 furlongs).

Inaugurated as the Endurance Handicap at a distance of one mile, seventy yards, its name was changed in 1952 by new track President, Larry MacPhail.

Winners (partial list)

1954 - Saratoga
1953 - Permian
1952 - no race
1951 - Jampol
1951 - Orco †
1950 - Bob Considine
1949 - Greek Song
1948 - Palestinian 
1947 - Hefty
1946 - Golden Bull
1945 - Lord Boswell
1944 - The Doge
1944 - Hail Victory † 
1943 - no race
1942 - Chop Chop
1941 - Sweet Swinger
1940 - Magnificent
1939 - Fenelon
1938 - no race
1937 - Legal Light
1936 - Betty's Buddy
1935 - Bright Plumage
1934 - Commonwealth
1933 - Chicstraw
1932 - Projectile
1931 - Mad Frump
1930 - Sweep All
1929 - Snowflake
1928 - Soul of Honor
1927 - Sortie
1926 - Dolan
1925 - High Star
1924 - Sumpter
1923 - Tree Top
1922 - Oui Oui
1921 - Champlain

† - Second division

References
 November 23, 1921 New York Times article on Champlain's win in the Endurance Handicap
 November 26, 1954 New York Times article on Saratioga's win in the Endurance Gold Cup Stakes

Discontinued horse races
Bowie Race Track
Horse races in Maryland
Flat horse races for two-year-olds
1921 establishments in Maryland
Recurring sporting events established in 1921